Great Food, All Day Long: Cook Splendidly, Eat Smart (2010) is Maya Angelou's second cookbook.  A follow-up to Hallelujah! The Welcome Table (2004), Great Food, All Day Long similarly combines recipes and autobiographical sketches about how Angelou lost weight by eating smaller portions of satisfying meals.  Her focus in this book is weight loss through portion control and flavor.

References

2010 non-fiction books
Books by Maya Angelou